New Salem is an unincorporated community in Union County, North Carolina, United States. It is located northeast of Monroe, at the intersection of NC 205 and NC 218. New Salem is also the site of Eastview Speedway, located on NC 205.

References

Unincorporated communities in Union County, North Carolina
Unincorporated communities in North Carolina